BASC may refer to:

 Berkeley APEC Study Center
 Berlin Air Safety Center
 British Association for Shooting and Conservation
 Bulacan Agricultural State College, Philippines 
 Business Alliance for Secure Commerce

See also

 Bachelor of Applied Science (BASc)
 BACS (disambiguation)
 Bask (disambiguation)
 Basque (disambiguation)